Kaniama is a city of the Democratic Republic of the Congo.  It is located in Haut-Lomami. As of 2012, it had an estimated population of 62,723

References 

Populated places in Haut-Lomami